The Ministry of Women and Children's Affairs (MWCA) or Ministry of Gender, Children and Social Protection (MGCSP) of Ghana is the government ministry responsible for the formulation of policies that promote the institutionalization and development of women and children issues.

History
The ministry was created in 2001 by the John Kufuor administration to address women and children issues.

Minister of the MWCA and MGCSP
The head of the ministry is the Minister of Women and Children's Affairs and Minister for Gender, Children and Social Protection. The first head of the ministry when it was created in 2001 was Gladys Asmah and first head of the ministry when it was renamed MGCSP in February 2013 is Nana Oye Lithur.

Aims and objectives of the ministry
The ministry has among its objectives the formulation of gender and children policies and guidelines, propose programmes that promote women and children affairs and the development of institutions that encourage women empowerment.

Advocacy
The ministry's role makes it advocate for better treatment for women and children. Issues of concern that come to the fore are handled by the ministry. One of such issues was the 2011 when the ministry announced it would in collaboration with the Ghana Department of Social Welfare undertake a re-registration of orphanages in the country. This was due to media publications of poor management of certain Orphanages in the country. The publications reported that the orphanages were being used as transit points for child trafficking and had become places of abuse for inmates.

Awards
The ministry in 2011 celebrated International Women's Day in Accra. During the celebration, the maiden Ghana Women of Excellence Awards was held at the Accra International Conference Centre. The awards day was themed ‘Empowering the Ghanaian Woman for National Development’. 34 Ghanaian women were honoured at the ceremony for their contribution to national development.

Achievements
The ministry from 2001 has worked on several issues of concern to both women and children. They include:
Abolishing the trafficking of children 
Increasing the number of women in major government sectors
Educating women about domestic violence
Improvement in domestic violence legislation

See also 
 Women in Ghana

References

Women in Ghana
Women and Children's Affairs
2001 establishments in Ghana
Ghana, Women and Children's Affairs
Ghana
Ghana
Women's rights in Ghana